Mill Woods  is a residential area in the city of Edmonton, Alberta, Canada. Located in southeast Edmonton, Mill Woods is bounded by Whitemud Drive (Highway 14) to the north, 91 Street to the west, 34 Street to the east, and Anthony Henday Drive (Highway 216) to the south.  Mill Woods is adjacent to three other residential areas including The Meadows to the east across 34 Street, and Southeast Edmonton and Ellerslie to the south and southwest respectively across Anthony Henday Drive.

The development of Mill Woods began in the early 1970s and was one of the first areas of Edmonton to move away from the grid system.

History 
The Mill Woods subdivision is situated in land that was once earmarked for an Indian reserve to belong to the Papaschase,a Métis-Cree band that signed treaty between 1876 and 1891. The reserve was deemed to have been abandoned in 1891 and the land was open to agriculture settlement and purchase by new arrivals. Part of the land was then settled by Moravian Brethren from Germany and Russia. Some of it  formed a short-lived communal farm in a community associated with the Bruederheim Moravian church. The City of Edmonton began assembling land in this area in 1970 as a means of addressing the shortage of and rising cost of serviced land in the vicinity of Edmonton, and City administrators prepared a plan to develop the area.

The Mill Woods Development Concept was approved in March 1971. It envisioned eight communities and a town centre community. The plan envisioned having a population of approximately 120,000 people at full build-out, a number the area currently contains.

Southeastern areas of Mill Woods suffered heavy damage from the Edmonton tornado in 1987.

The designation of the original Papaschase reserve as abandoned is disputed by the descendants of the Papaschase band. They brought a lawsuit for compensation against the government of Canada in 2001. The Supreme Court of Canada dismissed the lawsuit in 2008 on the grounds that the statute of limitations had expired.

Naming 
Mill Woods was named for Mill Creek, which bisects the northeast portion of the area, as well as the formerly wooded nature of the area. It is in line with the mock pastoral names generally chosen for suburban neighbourhoods.

The aboriginal heritage of the area is reflected in the names of numerous neighbourhoods in Mill Woods. For example, the Satoo neighbourhood is named for Chief Satoo of the Cree people.

Geography 

Mill Woods comprises a town centre community (Mill Woods Town Centre) and eight surrounding communities (Burnewood, Knottwood, Lakewood, Millbourne, Millhurst, Ridgewood, Southwood, and Woodvale), which are each divided into multiple neighbourhoods. Millbourne was divided into the sub-communities of Leefield and North Millbourne before being divided into two neighbourhoods each.

The communities within Mill Woods are connected by an arterial ring road, Mill Woods Road, along its east, south, and west extent and by 38 Avenue along its north extent. Smaller collector ring roads that intersect Mill Woods Road connect the multiple neighbourhoods typically found within each community.

Within the circle formed by these eight communities are the neighbourhoods of Mill Woods Park, Mill Woods Town Centre and Tawa.  Together, these three neighbourhoods form a largely business and service core intended to allow Mill Woods to function as a self-contained community.

Amenities 
Mill Woods contains Mill Woods Town Centre (a major shopping mall), the Grey Nuns Community Hospital, an Edmonton Fire Service station. It contains Edmonton Police Service's Southeast Division headquarters; there is a City run Recreation Centre, and is home to Mill Woods Park. As well as Mill Woods Golf Course in the just south of Whitemud Drive.

Schools 
Mill Woods has twenty-one  Edmonton Public elementary schools, eleven Edmonton Catholic elementary schools, four public junior high schools, three Catholic junior high schools. As well as two high schools J. Percy Page High School, and Holy Trinity Catholic High School. Edmonton Catholic Schools also operates an alternative outreach high school in Mill Woods. Previously, Mill Woods has also been home to the Mill Woods (South) Campus of MacEwan University.

Events 
The Mill Woods Presidents' Council, community leagues throughout Mill Woods, and various corporate sponsors provide Canada Day celebrations in Mill Woods Park on July 1 of each year. It features free family entertainment including various musical performances, petting zoos, hay rides and other activities, and concludes with a fireworks display comparable with the Edmonton's primary display in the river valley. Each year around 60,000 people crowd the park for this event, which is the largest neighbourhood celebration in Canada.

Demographics 

The total population of Mill Woods according to the City of Edmonton's 2012 municipal census is 78,322. The following is a population breakdown of Mill Woods by neighbourhood.

Transportation
There are two Edmonton Transit Service bus terminals: Lakewood Transit Centre, near Mill Woods Recreation Centre on 28 Avenue NW, and Mill Woods Transit Centre at Mill Woods Town Centre.

Two freeways run by Mill Woods including, Whitemud Drive on the north side and the Anthony Henday Drive on the south; both running east–west. Several arterial roads run in and around Mill Woods. Running north-south are 91 Street, 66 Street, 50 Street and 34 Street. Running east-west are the two freeways as well as 23 Avenue, and 34 Avenue.

In 2022 the Valley Line (Edmonton) of the Edmonton Light Rail Transit system was completed, and in doing so adding 3 stations in Mill Woods; Millbourne/Woodvale stop, at 38 Avenue NW and 66 Street NW, Grey Nuns stop at 66 Street NW and 31 Street NW, and Mill Woods station at 28 Avenue and 62 Street NW.  The Valley Line has yet to open to the public, but is expected to do so in 2023.

References

Notes

External links 
Mill Woods website

Neighbourhoods in Edmonton